Pearl Hill State Park is a  Massachusetts state park located in the town of Townsend about  from Boston. The park lies adjacent to Willard Brook State Forest and is managed by the Department of Conservation and Recreation (DCR).

Activities and amenities
Trails are used for hiking, mountain biking, cross-country  skiing, and snowmobiling tether ball. A somewhat challenging  trail connects to Willard Brook State Forest.
There are 51 campsites with a modern bathhouse. 
A day-use area includes a  pond with a beach area. 
The park also offers picnicking, fishing, and interpretive programs.

References

External links
Pearl Hill State Park Department of Conservation and Recreation
Willard Brook State Forest Map Department of Conservation and Recreation

State parks of Massachusetts
Massachusetts state forests
Massachusetts natural resources
Parks in Middlesex County, Massachusetts
Campgrounds in Massachusetts